Time-Life Building may refer to:
1 Rockefeller Plaza, New York City, completed 1939, Time, Inc. offices 1938-1960
1271 Avenue of the Americas, New York City, completed 1960, Time, Inc. offices 1960-2014
Time-Life Building (Chicago), completed 1969

See also
Time-Life Screen, an architectural sculpture in Mayfair, London, England